1998 in Russian football was marked by Spartak Moscow's sixth national title.

National team
Russia national football team began their qualification for the Euro 2000.

 Russia score given first
Key
 H = Home match
 A = Away match
 F = Friendly
 ECQ = 2000 UEFA European Football Championship qualifying, Group 4

Leagues
The Russian league system underwent reorganization for the 1998 season. The "leagues" were renamed "divisions". The Second Division was extended to six zones with 16-22 teams (compared to three zones of the Second League), while the Third League was abolished. These changes reduced the number of levels in Russian professional football to three.

Top Division

First Division

Saturn won the First Division, winning their first promotion to the Top Division. Runners-up Lokomotiv Nizhny Novgorod made their return to the top flight.

 Andradina of Arsenal became the top goalscorer with 27 goals.

Second Division
Of six clubs that finished first in their respective Second Division zones, five with the best records were promoted to the First Division, and one went to a promotion/relegation playoff.

The clubs promoted automatically were
FC Spartak-Orekhovo Orekhovo-Zuyevo (Centre)
FC Volgar-Gazprom Astrakhan (South)
FC Torpedo-Victoria Nizhny Novgorod (Povolzhye)
FC Amkar Perm (Ural)
FC Metallurg Krasnoyarsk (East)

Torpedo-ZIL won the play-off and were promoted to the First Division at the expense of Neftekhimik.

Cup
The Russian Cup was won by Spartak Moscow, who beat Lokomotiv Moscow 1–0 in the final.

UEFA club competitions

UEFA Cup Winners' Cup 1997-98
Lokomotiv Moscow reached the semifinal of the 1997–98 UEFA Cup Winners' Cup. They eliminated AEK Athens in the quarterfinal but were stopped by VfB Stuttgart in the semifinal.

UEFA Cup 1997-98
Spartak Moscow reached the semifinal of the 1997–98 UEFA Cup after beating Ajax Amsterdam in both quarterfinal matches. However, in the semifinal Internazionale Milano F.C. won both matches against Spartak 2–1.

UEFA Intertoto Cup 1998
Two Russian clubs played in the UEFA Intertoto Cup 1998, both being eliminated in the third round. Baltika Kaliningrad recorded victories over PFC Spartak Varna and OD Trencin before facing FK Vojvodina, and Shinnik Yaroslavl, who had a bye to the second round, defeated Turun Palloseura before being knocked out by Valencia CF.

UEFA Champions League 1998-99
Spartak Moscow qualified for the group stage of the 1998–99 UEFA Champions League by defeating PFC Litex Lovech with an aggregate score of 11–2. Spartak finished third in Group C with Internazionale Milano F.C., Real Madrid, and SK Sturm Graz.

UEFA Cup Winners' Cup 1998-99
Lokomotiv Moscow began their way to the 1998–99 UEFA Cup Winners' Cup semifinal by eliminating Arsenal Kyiv and SC Braga in the first two rounds.

UEFA Cup 1998-99
Rotor Volgograd were eliminated after the second qualifying round of 1998–99 UEFA Cup, losing twice to Red Star Belgrade. Dynamo Moscow were more successful, winning on aggregate against Polonia Warszawa in the second qualifying round and against Skonto FC in the first round. Their campaign ended after two losses to Real Sociedad in the second round.

References
National team fixtures 
League and cup results
League scorers 
UEFA Champions League results
UEFA Cup Winners' Cup results: 1997-98 1998-99
UEFA Cup results: 1997-98 1998-99 
UEFA Intertoto Cup results

 
Seasons in Russian football

it:Top Division 1998